The Indiana Eastern Railroad  is a short-line railroad in the U.S. states of Indiana and Ohio, operating a former Chesapeake and Ohio Railway line between Richmond, Indiana and Fernald, Ohio under lease from CSX Transportation. It began operations in 2005 as a subsidiary of the Respondek Railroad, and interchanges freight with CSX at Cottage Grove. Its business headquarters is in Edwardsville, Illinois with its operations headquarters in Liberty, Indiana

History
The trackage operated by the IERR was completed in 1904 by the Chicago, Cincinnati and Louisville Railroad as part of a Cincinnati-Chicago line. The Chesapeake and Ohio Railway of Indiana, a newly incorporated subsidiary of the Chesapeake and Ohio Railway (C&O), acquired the line at foreclosure sale in 1910. In 1978, the Chessie System, owner of the C&O and Baltimore and Ohio Railroad (B&O), closed the steep approach to downtown Cincinnati over Cheviot Hill in order to construct Queensgate Yard. Trains were rerouted to use the B&O's Indianapolis Subdivision via Hamilton, rejoining the C&O at Cottage Grove. The much flatter portion of the line between Cottage Grove and the Fernald Feed Materials Production Center was kept in service. In 2005, CSX, successor to the Chessie System, leased the line between Fernald and Richmond to the newly created Indiana Eastern Railroad, which began operations on August 29.

References

External links

Indiana Eastern Railroad

Indiana railroads
Ohio railroads
Railway companies established in 2005
Spin-offs of CSX Transportation